A honeymoon is the traditional holiday taken by newlyweds.

Honeymoon, The Honeymoon, or Honey Moon may also refer to:

Places
 Honeymoon Bridge (disambiguation), several bridges
 Honeymoon Island State Park, a Florida State Park located on Honeymoon Island

Arts, entertainment, and media

Films
 Honeymoon (1928 American film), a comedy film directed by Robert A. Golden
 Honeymoon (1928 German film), a silent film directed by E.W. Emo
 Honeymoon (1941 film), a 1941 Italian film
 Honeymoon (1947 film), an American comedy film directed by William Keighley
 Honeymoon (1956 film), a Soviet comedy film
 Honeymoon (1959 film), a British / Spanish film directed by Michael Powell
 Honeymoon (1972 film) (Swedish: Smekmånad), a Swedish drama film directed by Claes Lundberg
 Honeymoon (1973 film), a Hindi comedy film directed by Hiren Nag
 Honeymoon (1974 film), an Indian Malayalam film
 Honeymoon (1985 film), a Franco-Canadian film by Patrick Jamain
 Honeymoon (1992 film), a Bollywood film
 Honeymoons (film), a 2009 Serbian-Albanian drama film
 Honeymoon (2013 film) (Czech: Líbánky), a Czech film directed by Jan Hřebejk
 Honeymoon (2014 film), an American horror film directed by Leigh Janiak
 Honeymoon (2018 film), an Indian Bengali comedy drama film directed by Premendu Bikash Chaki
 Honeymoon (2022 film), an Indian Punjabi-language comedy-drama film

Literature
 "Honeymoon", a 1905 poem by Noël Coward
 Honeymoon, a 2000 novel by Amy Jenkins
 Honeymoon, a 1995 novel by Patrick Modiano
 Honeymoon, a novel by James Patterson & Howard Roughan
 The Honey Moon, an 1805 play by John Tobin
 The Honeymoon, a 1987 novel by Knut Faldbakken
 The Honeymoon, a 2004 novel by Justin Haythe
 The Honeymoon, a 1986 novel by Violet Winspear

Music

Albums
 Honey Moon (The Handsome Family album), 2009
 Honeymoon (Lana Del Rey album), 2015 (or its title song, see below)
 Honeymoon (Beach Bunny album), 2020
 Honeymoon, a 1999 album by Rondò Veneziano

Songs
"Honeymoon" (Lana Del Rey song), a 2015 song by Lana Del Rey 
"Honeymoon" (Joe Howard song), a 1929 song by Joseph E. Howard
"Honeymoon", a song by Clinton Ford
"Honeymoon", a song by Marino Marini
"Honeymoon", a song by Tomahawk from the 2001 album Tomahawk

Television
 "Honeymoon" (Brooklyn Nine-Nine), an episode of the sixth season of Brooklyn Nine-Nine
Mah-e Asal, Iranian TV series meaning "Honeymoon"
 "The Honeymoon" (Dynasty), a 1981 episode of the American television series Dynasty
The Honeymooners, American television series
 Honeymoon (Indian TV series), Indian Kannada-language series

Other uses
Honeymoon (horse), an American Thoroughbred racehorse
 Honeymoon Handicap, an American Grade II Thoroughbred horse race
Honeymoon suite (hotel), a type of suite at hotels and cruises

See also

 
 
 Honey (disambiguation)
 Moon (disambiguation)